Geethal Malinda (born 2 April 1997) is a Sri Lankan cricketer. He made his first-class debut for Kalutara Town Club in Tier B of the 2018–19 Premier League Tournament on 27 March 2019.

References

External links
 

1997 births
Living people
Sri Lankan cricketers
Kalutara Town Club cricketers
Place of birth missing (living people)